Wellington Vernon Dean (born May 5, 1959) is a former professional American football cornerback in the National Football League (NFL) for the Washington Redskins and Seattle Seahawks.  He played college football at San Diego State University and was drafted in the second round of the 1982 NFL Draft. Dean was the Defensive Backs coach at Virginia State University  and is currently the Defensive Backs coach for the DC Defenders of the XFL.

Professional career
Dean played 7 seasons in the NFL, 6 with the Washington Redskins. His finest season was in 1984, when he picked off 7 passes and had 114 int return yards and scored 2 touchdowns. He appeared in 101 games throughout his career, and finished with 22 interceptions and 2 touchdowns.

Coaching career 
Dean was hired by the DC Defenders on September 13, 2022.

Personal life

References

1959 births
Living people
American football cornerbacks
People from Houston
Seattle Seahawks players
San Diego State Aztecs football players
Washington Redskins players